William Hale may refer to:

William Hale (cattleman), the so-called "King of the Osage Hills", U.S. cattleman and convicted murderer
William Hale (director) (born 1934), American film and television director
William Hale (New Hampshire politician) (1765–1848), U.S. Representative from New Hampshire
William Hale (British inventor) (1797–1870), British inventor and rocket pioneer
William Hale (professor) (born 1940), specialist on Turkey and Turkish politics, and Professor of Politics
William Gardner Hale (1849–1928), American classical scholar
 William Hale (Wyoming politician) (1832–1885), Wyoming Territory governor, 1882–1885, and Iowa legislator
 William Bayard Hale (1869–1924), American journalist
 William Ellery Hale (1836–1898), American businessman
Willie Hale (born 1945), American R&B musician
 William Hale (priest) (1795–1870), author and Archdeacon of London
 William Harlan Hale (1910–1974), American writer, journalist and editor
 William J. Hale (1874–1944), African-American university president
 William John Hale (1862–1929), British architect
Bill Hale, see The Adventures of Rin Tin Tin
William Hale (Michigan Attorney General) (1809–1874), Michigan Attorney General

See also
William Haile (disambiguation)